Nanna is a genus of small to medium-sized predatory flies.

Species
N. amurensis Ozerov, 2010
N. armillata (Zetterstedt, 1846)
N. armillata (Zetterstedt, 1846)
N. articulata (Becker, 1894)
N. atripes (Malloch, 1931)
N. bispinosa (Malloch, 1920)
N. brevifrons (Zetterstedt, 1838)
N. brevifrons (Zetterstedt, 1838)
N. brunneicosta (Johnson, 1927)
N. carbonarium (Hendel, 1930)
N. fasciata (Meigen, 1826)
N. flavipes (Fallén, 1819)
N. indotatum Engelmark, 1999
N. inermis (Becker, 1894)
N. kamtschatkense (Hendel, 1930)
N. katmaiensis (Malloch, 1920)
N. leucochaetum (Meijere, 1907)
N. leucostoma (Zetterstedt, 1846)
N. leucostoma (Zetterstedt, 1846)
N. loewi (Becker, 1894)
N. longicornis (Roser, 1840)
N. mensurata (Becker, 1894)
N. multisetosa (Hackman, 1956)
N. nigrifrontata (Becker, 1894)
N. nigriventris (Loew, 1864)
N. nutans (Becker, 1894)
N. pallidipes (Malloch, 1922)
N. puberula (Becker, 1894)
N. rossolimoae Ozerov, 2010
N. similis (Coquillett, 1902)
N. tibiella (Zetterstedt, 1838)
N. tibiella (Zetterstedt, 1838)
N. truncata Fan, 1976
N. unispinosa (Malloch, 1920)

References

Scathophagidae
Schizophora genera
Taxa named by Gabriel Strobl